Chris Small (born 30 November 1986) is a New Zealand cricketer. He played in three first-class matches for Canterbury in 2006.

See also
 List of Canterbury representative cricketers

References

External links
 

1986 births
Living people
New Zealand cricketers
Canterbury cricketers
Cricketers from Christchurch